The Villiers Stakes is an Australian Turf Club Group 2 Thoroughbred horse race held under open handicap conditions, for horses aged three years old and upwards, over a distance of 1,600 metres held at Randwick Racecourse, Sydney, Australia in early December. The total prize money for this race is A$750,000.

History

Distance
 1892–1901 - 6 furlongs (~1200 metres)
 1902–1971 - 1 mile (~1609 metres)
 1972–2006 – 1600 metres
 January 2008 – 1400 metres 
 December 2008 onwards - 1600 metres

Grade
 1892–1978 - Principal Race
 1979–1985 - Group 3
 1986 onwards - Group 2

Venue
 2001, 2011, 2012 - Warwick Farm Racecourse

Winners

 2021 - Brutality
 2020 - Greysful Glamour
 2019 - Quackerjack
 2018 - Sky Boy
 2017 - Crack Me Up
 2016 - Sense Of Occasion
 2015 - Happy Clapper
 2014 - Rudy
 2013 - Ninth Legion
 2012 - All Legal
 2011 - Monton
 2010 - Dances On Waves
 2009 - Palacio De Cristal
 2008 - Something Anything
 2007 - Honor in War
 2006 - Utzon
 2005 - Aqua D'Amore
 2004 - Ikes Dream
 2003 - On A High
 2002 - Boreale
 2001 - Carael Boy
 2000 - Grey And Gold
 1999 - Final Fantasy
 1998 - Referral
 1997 - Arletty
 1996 - Touch Of Force
 1995 - Heres The Prince
 1994 - Aunty Mary
 1993 - Cobbora
 1992 - Soho Square
 1991 - Shining Wind
 1990 - Post Elect
 1989 - Spot The Rock
 1988 - Tumble On
 1987 - Card Shark
 1986 - Roman Artist
 1985 - Dinky Flyer
 1984 - Rising Prince
 1983 - Northern Reward
 1982 - Hussars Command
 1981 - Zing Along
 1980 - Tuna Too
 1979 - Kings Ideal
 1978 - Dear John
 1977 - Hot Diggity
 1976 - Top Wing
 1975 - St Martin
 1974 - Americano
 1973 - Oncidon
 1972 - Torumba
 1971 - Tumberlua
 1970 - Silver Points
 1969 - Sir To Me
 1968 - Domino King
 1967 - Maigret
 1966 - Nandaroo
 1965 - Castanea
 1964 - †Gay Song / Blue Era 
 1963 - Key
 1962 - Emboss
 1961 - Gene San
 1960 - Grenoble
 1959 - Comte De Paris
 1958 - Caesar
 1957 - Top Ruler
 1956 - Empire Link
 1955 - Lazy Day
 1954 - Kev Mar
 1953 - Raconteur
 1952 - Carioca
 1951 - Mercury
 1950 - Field Boy
 1949 - Veiled Art
 1948 - Filipino
 1947 - Barnsley
 1946 - Native Son
 1945 - Bernborough
 1944 - Precise
 1943 - Sir Neith
 1942 - Riverton
 1941 - Yaralla
 1940 - Rimveil
 1939 - Rodborough
 1938 - Fakenham
 1937 - Ramdin
 1936 - Kings Head
 1935 - Golden Chance
 1933 - Closing Time
 1932 - Magnetic
 1931 - High Disdain
 1930 - Pavilion
 1929 - Habashon
 1928 - Reonui
 1927 - Zuleika
 1926 - Queen Alwyne
 1925 - Hemisphere
 1924 - Balbus
 1923 - Mont Clair
 1922 - Wish Wynne
 1921 - Sail On
 1920 - Fluency
 1919 - Anyhow
 1918 - Rebus
 1917 - Cetigne
 1916 - Wedding Day
 1915 - Lord Nagar
 1914 - Challenge Crosse
 1913 - Popinjay
 1912 - Embracer
 1911 - Myra Bluan
 1910 - Lady Ruenalf
 1909 - Miss Flaneur
 1908 - Virtu
 1907 - Kyeadgerie
 1906 - Luciana
 1905 - Refrain
 1904 - Cherson
 1903 - Air Motor
 1902 - Kinglock
 1901 - Sir Leonard
 1900 - Fulminate
 1899 - Coralie
 1898 - Satan
 1897 - Loch Marie
 1896 - Vivian
 1895 - Ordnance
 1894 - Moorefield
 1893 - Bliss
 1892 - Two Up

† Dead heat

See also
 List of Australian Group races
 Group races

References

Horse races in Australia
Randwick Racecourse